Carlo Clerici (3 September 1929 – 28 January 2007) was a Swiss professional road bicycle racer.

The highlight of his career was his overall win in the 1954 Giro d'Italia.

Major results

1950
 3rd Stausee-Rundfahrt Klingnau
1952
 1st GP de Suisse
 2nd Züri-Metzgete
 2nd GP du Locle
 2nd Rund um Altdorf
 3rd Overall Tour de Suisse
 10th Overall Tour de Romandie
1953
 2nd Rund um Altdorf
 3rd Züri-Metzgete
 4th Overall Tour de Suisse
 6th Overall Tour de Romandie
 7th Giro del Ticino
1954
 1st  Overall Giro d'Italia
1st Stage 6
 1st GP du Locle
 3rd Road race, National Road Championships
 3rd Overall Tour de Romandie
 4th Züri-Metzgete
1955
 2nd Road race, National Road Championships
 3rd Overall Tour de Suisse
 4th Züri-Metzgete
 4th Genoa–Nice
 5th Overall Tour de Romandie
1956
 1st Züri-Metzgete
 1st GP du Locle
 2nd Overall Tour de Romandie
 9th Giro dell'Emilia
1957
 7th Overall Tour de Suisse

Grand Tour general classification results timeline

References

External links
 

1929 births
2007 deaths
Giro d'Italia winners
Swiss Giro d'Italia stage winners
Swiss male cyclists
Deaths from cancer in Switzerland
Cyclists from Zürich
20th-century Swiss people
21st-century Swiss people